SM5, Sm5, sM5 or sm5 stands for:
 Superman Returns, the fifth Superman film
 VR Class Sm5, a type of train operated by the VR Group
 Renault Samsung SM5, a car produced by Renault Samsung
 SM5 postcode area, the London Borough of Sutton postcode area covering Carshalton, Carshalton Beeches, Carshalton on the Hill, The Wrythe, Carshalton Village, Eastern St. Helier, and Middleton Circle.
SM-5, one of the computer algorithms used in SuperMemo
 Shure SM5, a precursor to the Shure SM7 microphone